TalonSoft, Inc. was an American video game developer and publisher based in Baltimore.

History 
TalonSoft was founded in March 1995, by video game producers Jim Rose and John Davidson. On December 24, 1998, Take-Two Interactive announced that it had acquired TalonSoft, stating that they planned to push their capabilities in the personal computer video game market. The deal comprised 1,033,336 shares accounted as a pooling-of-interest. Bengur Bryan represented TalonSoft in the purchase. By early 1999, TalonSoft's most successful game was East Front, with sales near 90,000 units. TalonSoft ceased all operations in 2002. In October 2005, Matrix Games acquired the rights to publish all games developed by TalonSoft.

List of games

References 

Take-Two Interactive divisions and subsidiaries
Video game companies established in 1995
Video game companies disestablished in 2002
Defunct video game companies of the United States
Video game development companies
Defunct companies based in Baltimore
Video game publishers